Podtabor may refer to:
Podtabor, Dobrepolje
Podtabor, Ilirska Bistrica
Šent Jurij, formerly known as  Podtabor pri Grosupljem